Gossamer most commonly refers to:

  Fine spider silk used by spiderlings for ballooning or kiting
 Gossamer (fabric), very light, sheer, gauze-like fabric

Gossamer  may also refer to:

Technology
 Gossamer Condor, the first human-powered aircraft capable of controlled and sustained flight
 Gossamer Albatross, a human-powered aircraft built by American aeronautical engineer Dr. Paul B. MacCready's AeroVironment
 The code name of the motherboard used in first-generation Apple G3 Macs

Culture
 The Gossamer Project (or Gossamer Archive), a large X-Files fan fiction archive
 Gossamer (Looney Tunes), a character in the Looney Tunes cartoons
 Gossamer, alias of two different DC Comics superheroes, Ayla Ranzz and Jay Nakamura

Literature
 Gossamer (novel), a 2006 novel by Lois Lowry
 Gossamer, a 1995 short story by Stephen Baxter in his collection Vacuum Diagrams and The Hard SF Renaissance anthology

Music
 Gossamer (album), by Passion Pit
 "Gossamer", a song by The Smashing Pumpkins from the tour for Zeitgeist but not released on the album

Biology
 Lycaenidae, gossamer-winged butterflies
 Euphaeidae, "gossamer-wings" (damselflies)

Other uses
 Gossamer, a golden ale produced by the Half Acre Beer Company in Chicago
 The gossamer rings of Jupiter
 Gossamer (horse)

See also